The 2012 AFC Champions League was the 31st edition of the top-level Asian club football tournament organized by the Asian Football Confederation (AFC), and the 10th under the current AFC Champions League title.

Ulsan Hyundai from South Korea won their first title, defeating Al-Ahli from Saudi Arabia with a 3–0 win in the final, and qualified for the 2012 FIFA Club World Cup.

Allocation of entries per association
The AFC approved criteria for participation in the 2011 and 2012 seasons. The final decision date was set after the Executive Committee meeting in November 2010.

On 30 November 2009, the AFC announced 12 more MA's that were keen to join the ACL, in addition to ten participating national associations. Singapore later withdrew. The full list of candidate associations were as follows:

East Asia
Participating:  Australia,  China PR,  Indonesia,  Japan,  Korea Republic
Applied to participate:  Malaysia,  Myanmar,  Thailand
Withdrew:  Singapore
Disqualified:  Vietnam

West Asia
Participating:  Iran,  Qatar,  Saudi Arabia,  UAE,  Uzbekistan
Applied to participate:  India,  Iraq,  Jordan,  Oman,  Pakistan,  Palestine,  Tajikistan,  Yemen

Note: India, Singapore, Thailand and Vietnam have clubs taking part in play-offs to qualify for the group stages of ACL in 2010.

Entrants per association
It was originally announced that the allocation for entry to the 2012 ACL would stay the same as the previous three seasons with the exception of Vietnam, who were disqualified, and their previous playoff slot was awarded to Qatar. However, following the AFC Executive Committee meeting in November 2011, it was decided that the number of slots for each association to be changed based on evaluation of the AFC Champions League criteria that took place in 2011.

A total of eleven member associations (see below) which participated in the 2011 AFC Champions League was evaluated for participating in the 2012 AFC Champions League. India, which played in the 2011 ACL play-off, was not evaluated and dropped to the AFC Cup. The other member associations which applied but did not meet the criteria for 2011 ACL was not evaluated at all for 2012.

Notes
 One of the group stage direct entrants from Uzbekistan was moved to the East Zone.
 One of the K-League clubs, Sangju Sangmu Phoenix, is unable to qualify for the ACL because the team is not a commercial entity and their players are not professionally contracted.
 While the 2010–11 A-League, the season which qualified Australian clubs to the 2012 ACL, had 11 teams, the 2011–12 A-League, the ongoing season, only has 10 teams after North Queensland Fury was closed, and this number was given in the 2012 ACL evaluation report (page 8). One of the A-League clubs, Wellington Phoenix, is based in New Zealand, an OFC member country, and are unable to qualify for the ACL.
 This number was given in the 2012 ACL evaluation report (page 8). The 2010–11 Indonesia Super League, the season which qualified Indonesian clubs to the 2012 ACL, had 15 teams, and the 2011–12 Indonesian Premier League, the ongoing top division recognized by the Football Association of Indonesia, has 13 teams. There are two rival "top-division" leagues in Indonesia: the Indonesian Premier League and the Indonesia Super League (the ISL was by then not recognized by the Football Association of Indonesia).
 China was allocated a berth in the qualifying play-off, but Liaoning Whowin, the 2011 Chinese Super League 3rd place, did not enter the competition. Therefore, only four teams entered the East Zone qualifying play-off.

Teams
A total of 37 teams participated in the 2012 AFC Champions League.
28 teams (14 in West Zone, 14 in East Zone) directly entered the group stage.
9 teams (5 in West Zone, 4 in East Zone) competed in the qualifying play-off, which was divided into two rounds. The 4 winners (2 in West Zone, 2 in East Zone) qualified for the group stage. Losers of the qualifying play-off final round entered the 2012 AFC Cup group stage. However, losers of the qualifying play-off semi-final round were eliminated from all AFC competitions, a change from previous seasons where they would also enter the AFC Cup.

Notes
* Number of appearances (including qualifying rounds) since the 2002/03 season, when the competition was rebranded as the AFC Champions League.
† Bunyodkor (Uzbekistan) was moved to the East Zone.
‡ Persipura Jayapura were initially disqualified by the AFC from participating but on appeal to the Court of Arbitration for Sport, the CAS ruled on 1 February 2012 that they should be provisionally reinstated to the competition and were entitled to play in the qualifying play-off.
Al-Kuwait (Kuwait), the 2011 AFC Cup runners-up, failed to fulfil the criteria set by AFC to compete in the 2012 AFC Champions League, and thus directly entered the 2012 AFC Cup. Nasaf Qarshi (Uzbekistan), the 2011 AFC Cup winners, already directly qualified for the group stage based on their domestic performance.

Schedule
Schedule of dates for 2012 competition.

Qualifying play-off

The draw for the qualifying play-off was held in Kuala Lumpur, Malaysia on 6 December 2011. The winners advanced to the group stage, while the losers of the final round advanced to the AFC Cup group stage, except the loser of the match between Adelaide United and Persipura Jayapura.

West Zone

!colspan="3"|Semi-final Round

|-
!colspan="3"|Final Round

|}

East Zone

!colspan="3"|Final Round

|}

Group stage

The draw for the group stage was held in Kuala Lumpur, Malaysia on 6 December 2011. Clubs from the same country may not be drawn into the same group. The winners and runners-up of each group advanced to the knockout stage.

Group A

Group B

Group C

Group D

Group E

Group F

Group G

Group H

Knockout stage

Bracket

Round of 16
The matchups for the round of 16 were decided based on the results from the group stage. Each tie was played as one match, hosted by the winners of each group (Team 1) against the runners-up of another group (Team 2).

Quarter-finals
The draw for the quarter-finals, semi-finals, and final was held in Kuala Lumpur, Malaysia on 14 June 2012. It determined the matchups for the quarter-finals and semi-finals as well as the potential host for the final.

Semi-finals

Final

The final of the 2012 AFC Champions League was hosted by one of the finalists, decided by a draw. According to the draw on 14 June 2012, the winner of semi-final 2 would host the final. Therefore, Ulsan Hyundai was the home team.

Top scorers

Note: Goals scored in qualifying play-off not counted.

Source:

See also
2012 AFC Cup
2012 AFC President's Cup

References

External links

 
2012
1